HMIS Hindustan (L80) was a  (also known as Hastings class) sloop which served in the Royal Indian Navy (RIN) during World War II. Her pennant number was changed to U80 in 1940.

Hindustan was transferred to Pakistan in 1948 after the independence, and eventually renamed PNS Karsaz. She was decommissioned from the Pakistan Navy in 1960.

Construction and design
HMIS Hindustan was laid down at the Swan Hunter shipyard in Wallsend, Tyne and Wear England on 4 September 1929, was launched on 12 May 1930 and completed on 10 October 1930, commissioning into the Royal Indian Marine.

Hindustan was built to a modified and longer version of the  design. Displacement was  standard. The ship had a complement of 119 officers and men.

The ship's main armament consisted of two 4-inch (102 mm) QF Mk IV guns. Unlike in the Hastings class, which had one 4-inch gun in an anti-aircraft mount, both guns were in Low-Angle mountings only suitable for use against surface targets. In addition four 3-pounder (47 mm) saluting guns were carried.

Service history
Following the outbreak of the Second World War, Hindustan was deployed to the Persian Gulf, patrolling the Straits of Hormuz and operating as part of the East Indies Station of the Royal Navy. In August 1940, Italy invaded British Somaliland, and Hindustan was deployed to Berbera, landing three of her 3-pounder guns to aid the defences, and covering the evacuation of Commonwealth forces from Berbera from 15 to 19 September. Hindustan was then refitted at Bombay (now Mumbai), being fitted with Sonar, previous plans to re-arm her with anti-aircraft 4-inch guns being abandoned.

During World War II, she was a part of the Eastern Fleet. She escorted numerous convoys in the Indian Ocean and the Persian Gulf between 1942-45. She also supported various amphibious landings of the British Indian Army and the British Army in Burma, Malaya, etc.

During the Royal Indian Navy mutiny – also known as Royal Indian Navy revolt – of February 1946 Hindustan was berthed at Karachi, and occupied by mutineers. When ordered to debark the mutineers refused, but finally surrendered after a brief firefight with the 15th (King's) Parachute Battalion, supported by four 75mm pack howitzers of C Troop, 159 Parachute Light Regiment, Royal Artillery.

At the time of independence, Hindustan was among the vessels transferred to the Royal Pakistan Navy in 1948, being renamed Karsaz.

References

Bibliography
 
 

 
 
 

1930 ships
Ships built by Swan Hunter
Hastings-class sloops of the Royal Indian Navy
India–Pakistan military relations
Hastings-class sloops of the Pakistan Navy